The 1959 Super Prestige Pernod was the first edition of the Super Prestige Pernod. It included 11 races all of which, apart from the World Championship race, started in France. It replaced the Challenge Desgrange-Colombo as the season-long competition for road bicycle racing. Henry Anglade won the overall title.

Races

Final standings

References

External links

 
Super Prestige Pernod
Super Prestige Pernod
1959 in European sport